Madara Peak is a 430 m peak in Vidin Heights on Varna Peninsula, Livingston Island in the South Shetland Islands, Antarctica.  Surmounting Panega Glacier to the south.  Steep and partly ice-free southern slopes.  The peak is named after the historic site of Madara in northeastern Bulgaria.

Location

Maps
 L.L. Ivanov et al. Antarctica: Livingston Island and Greenwich Island, South Shetland Islands. Scale 1:100000 topographic map. Sofia: Antarctic Place-names Commission of Bulgaria, 2005.
 L.L. Ivanov. Antarctica: Livingston Island and Greenwich, Robert, Snow and Smith Islands. Scale 1:120000 topographic map.  Troyan: Manfred Wörner Foundation, 2009.

References
 Madara Peak. SCAR Composite Antarctic Gazetteer
 Bulgarian Antarctic Gazetteer. Antarctic Place-names Commission. (details in Bulgarian, basic data in English)

External links
 Madara Peak. Copernix satellite image

Mountains of Livingston Island